The following lists events that happened during 1957 in the Union of Soviet Socialist Republics.

Incumbents
 First Secretary of the Communist Party of the Soviet Union – Nikita Khrushchev
 Chairman of the Presidium of the Supreme Soviet of the Soviet Union – Kliment Voroshilov
 Chairman of the Council of Ministers of the Soviet Union – Nikolai Bulganin

Events
 1957 Soviet nuclear tests
 Doctor Zhivago (novel) is published in Italy by Boris Pasternak after being rejected by Soviet censors.

May
 May – The Anti-Party Group attempts to overthrow Nikita Khrushchev.

July
 28 July – The 6th World Festival of Youth and Students is opened.

September
 26 September – Soviet submarine M-256 sinks after one of its diesel engines explodes.
 29 September – Kyshtym disaster

October
 4 October – Sputnik 1, the first artificial Earth satellite, is launched.

November
 November – The 3rd Soviet Antarctic Expedition arrives in Antarctica.
 7 November – The dog Laika becomes the first animal to orbit the Earth when Sputnik 2 is launched.

Births
 27 February – Viktor Markin, athlete
 14 April – Mikhail Pletnev, pianist
 4 October – Aleksandr Tkachyov, gymnast
 3 December – Maxim Korobov, politician

Deaths
 9 July - Alexander Fyodorovich Gedike, composer (born 1877)
 15 July – Vasily Maklakov, politician (born 1869)

See also
 1957 in fine arts of the Soviet Union
 List of Soviet films of 1957

References

 
1950s in the Soviet Union
Years in the Soviet Union
Soviet Union
Soviet Union
Soviet Union